Gudilova is a Neighbourhood of Visakhapatnam district. It lies in between the beautiful hill area of Kambalakonda Wildlife Sanctuary which lies in the family of Eastern Ghats. Gudilova is famous for Lord Shiva and PandurangaSwamy.

Vijnana Vihara Residential School is also located here.

Transport
APSRTC routes

References

Neighbourhoods in Visakhapatnam